Jeta is a coastal island in Guinea-Bissau. It is located west of Pecixe. Its area is 109 km².

See also
List of islands of Guinea-Bissau

References 

Atlantic islands of Guinea-Bissau